TKT could refer to:

 TKT (ELT), or Teaching Knowledge Test, a credential
 The Killing Tree, band from Chicago, Illinois, US
 Transketolase, an enzyme
 Twisted Kaiju Theater, a webcomic
 Tak Airport, Thailand, IATA code
 Kathoriya Tharu, a Tharu languages variant, ISO 639-3 code

See also
 TKTS, ticket booths in New York City and London